Kevin Kearney (born 22 August 1936 in Campsie, New South Wales) is an Australian analogue location sound recordist, film producer, director, actor and digital producer, director and editor.

Early life
Kearney was born on 22 August 1936 at Canterbury Hospital in Campsie.

Kearney was the third child of Kathleen and Jack Kearney. Kearney's paternal and maternal families arrived in Australia from Ireland in the mid-1800s.  His mother and father were born in March and January, 1898 respectively. Kearney's maternal grandfather, Bernard Reilly was elected as an alderman to the first Crookwell Shire Council in 1905 Kearney's parents married in May 1924 at St Mary's Cathedral, Sydney.

Kearney grew up in Bondi. In February 1942, Kearney became a student at Waverley College in Waverley, where he remained for the next fifteen years.

In December 1957 Kearney travelled to the Australian Outback and worked on the Alice Springs to Darwin road. During this time, he was invited to corroborees by the Mutitjulu elders of the Anangu people of the regions.

Television career
In 1962, Kearney began working at the Australian Broadcasting Corporation in Gore Hill. His first job at ABC-TV was as a propsman on Mr Squiggle and Miss Gina (Gina Curtis).  Concurrent with Mr Squiggle, he worked on The Bryan Davies Show.

In 1964, Kearney became assistant floor manager on My Brother Jack (1965), based on George Johnston's novel.  In 1966, Kearney was floor manager and assistant floor manager on the children's program Play School.  That same year, he worked as assistant floor manager and studio hand on Australian Playhouse and as studio hand on Duke Ellington at ABC-TV (1966).  In 1967, Kearney worked in staging on Contrabandits (1967) and was floor manager and assistant floor manager on Four Corners (1967).

Kearney resigned from ABC-TV in October 1967 and on 11 November 1967 joined the production of the TV series Riptide.   He began this series as a boom operator and later became a sound recordist.  In 1969, Kearney left Riptide to become perhaps Australia's first freelancer in its analogue film industry with Graham Jennings as his first agent.

Television
Mr Squiggle (1959 - 1989) - propsman
The Bryan Davies Show (1981 - 1982) propsman
My Brother Jack (1965) - floor manager
Cinderella - The Opera (1965) - studio hand
Play School - floor manager / assistant floor manager
Australian Playhouse (1966) - assistant floor manager / studio hand
Duke Ellington @ ABC-TV (1966) - studio hand
Contrabandits (1967) - staging
Four Corners - assistant floor / assistant floor manager / studio hand
Riptide (1967 - 1969) - sound recordist / boom operator
Skippy the Bush Kangaroo (1967 - 1969) - second sound recordist
Woobinda, Animal Doctor (1968 - 1969) - second sound recordist

Theatre
Concurrent with his TV work, Kearney also worked at John Clugson's Staging Factory, Paddington. While working at Clugson's, Kearney was asked to join the Executive of Doris Fitton's Independent Theatre in North Sydney as stage manager.  He worked there for four years with senior producer Peter Summerton, producer Michael Lake, publicist Jone Winchester and stage director John Whitham.  Kearney also provided playback sound for "Action Poetry on Stage" a poetry reading at the Pact Theatre, Pyrmont.

In 1969, Kearney formed Zoom Productions and then Lighthouse Productions with Val Hodgson and Gordon Mutch, staging light shows at The Roundhouse at the University of New South Wales. The same group then worked on Sights and Sounds of '69 at the Sydney Town Hall, which Kearney produced and directed. The show featured music by Tully, John Sangster Jazz Group, Susan Prendergast, Alan Moarywaala Barker, Lindsay Bourke and Dave MacRae.

The Independent Theatre
 Aladdin (1963) - Stage Manager
 Dylan (1963) - Stage Manager
 The Aspern Papers - Stage Manager
 The Marriage of Mr Mississippi (1965) - Stage Manager* "An Evening with Moel Coward"(1965) - Stage Manager
 After the Fall

The Q Theatre
 Sunday at the Q (1964) - Stage Manager

The Lane Cove Musical Society
 The White Horse Inn (1964) - Staging
 HMAS Pinafore (1964) - Staging
 The Mikado (1964) - Staging

Pact Theatre
 Action Poetry on Stage (1969) - Playback Recordist

Sydney Town Hall
 Sights & Sounds of '69 (1969) - Producer / Director

Films
Kearney's first film was producer Graham Jennings 1970 film Silo 15 . He was then booked as the second boom operator for second sound recordist Hans Wetzel on producers Lee Robinson and Dennis Hill's 1969 film The Intruders.

Kearney then produced and directed Headland '69 with director / cinematographer Stanley Dalby. The film featured Andrew Fleming and Gillian Anderson]. The film was featured in a work print format at "Sights & Sounds of '69" at the Sydney Town Hall. The film included the music of the band Tully from the concert.

For the 1971 film Walkabout,  Kearney worked as boom operator for sound recordist Barry Brown and also worked as second sound recordist when required.

Films
 Silo 15 (1969) - feature - boom operator
 The Intruders (1969) - feature - second sound recordist
 Headlands '69 (1970) - feature - producer / director/ sound design
 Walkabout (1970) - feature - boom operator - second sound recordist

Films on which Kevin Kearney was Producer / Director / Camera

 Stoned View of Asia  (1970) Director / Camera / Sound Design
 International Women's Day 1975  (1975) Producer / Sound Design
 Makeup  (1977) Sound Design
 Nyoman Gunarsa  (1978) Producer / Sound Design
 Big Time in Nelson  (1983) Producer / Sound Design
 Waiting for Djuarn  (1999) Director / Camera / Sound Design 
 JTs Birthday (2000) Director / Camera / Sound Design
 Take Your Time (2002) Director / Camera / Sound Design
 Lietelinna  (2002) Producer / Camera / Sound Design
 Secrets of the Kitchen (2003) Director / Camera / Sound Design
 Watch Out There's a Dugong About (2004) Director / Camera / Sound Design
 When I'm 64 with Preston Warne (2004) Director / Camera / Sound Design
 Quandamooka  (2005) Producer / Director / Camera / Sound Design
 Time with Barry Brown (2006) Producer / Co-camera / Sound Design
 I Hate Doors (2005) Director / Camera / Sound Design
 Honeymoon Sweet" (2006) Director / Camera / Sound Design
 The Faces of Ms Zsa Zsa  (2010) Director / Camera / Sound Design

See IMDb for further list of features, documentaries, telemovies, series, shorts and music videos that Kevin Kearney has
worked on.

Commercials
During the above period Kevin Kearney completed 3,000 commercials as sound recordist / boom operator 

 Writing
Stage Plays
 Ceres of Events (1966)

Television
 The High Life (1968) Riptide Episode - uncredited
 An Island Unto Himsel (1968) Riptide Episode - uncredited

Screenplays
 White Angel (1965) an adaptation from an original short story "White Angel" by Ned McCann
 Republic (1992) - feature film

Acting
 Nightwait (1966) - Milkbar Customer - Director Stanley Dalby
 4 Eyes Fastest Gun'' (1966) - Deputy Sheriff - Director Gary Shead

References

Living people
1936 births